The 1940 Indiana gubernatorial election was held on November 5, 1940. Democratic nominee Henry F. Schricker narrowly defeated Republican nominee Glenn R. Hillis with 49.92% of the vote.

General election

Candidates
Major party candidates
Henry F. Schricker, Democratic, Lieutenant Governor under M. Clifford Townsend
Glenn R. Hillis, Republican
James Emmert, Republican, former Shelby County Circuit Court judge

Other candidates
Mary Donovan Hapgood, Socialist
Omer S. Whiteman, Prohibition
Herman Barcus Barefield, Socialist Labor

Results

References

1940
Indiana
Gubernatorial